is a railway station on the Soya Main Line in Osashima, Otoineppu, Hokkaido,  Japan, operated by the Hokkaido Railway Company (JR Hokkaido).

Lines

Adjacent stations

History

The station opened on 8 November 1922. With the privatization of Japanese National Railways (JNR) on 1 April 1987, the station came under the control of JR Hokkaido.

In July 2016, JR Hokkaido informed the local government of its intention to close the station from the start of the revised timetable in March 2017 due to low patronage. However, in April 2017, it was announced that JR Hokkaido would continue to maintain the station for the time being.

Passenger statistics
During the period between fiscal 2011 and 2015, the station was used on average by less than one passenger daily.

Surrounding area
  National Route 40
 Teshio River

See also
 List of railway stations in Japan

References

External links

  

Railway stations in Hokkaido Prefecture
Stations of Hokkaido Railway Company
Sōya Main Line
Railway stations in Japan opened in 1922